Bruce Randolph School is a public school in Denver, Colorado, United States. It serves grades six through twelve.

Part of Denver Public Schools, Bruce Randolph began to operate autonomously in 2007 in a bid to turn around its dismal graduation rates, which was successful.  As part as the changes, each teacher had to reapply for their job, after which only six of forty remained. Its turnaround in student graduation rates between 2006 and 2010 was praised by US President Barack Obama during his 2011 State of the Union Address.

References

External links 
 

High schools in Denver
Public high schools in Colorado
Schools in Denver
Public middle schools in Colorado